Greenia may refer to:
 Greenia (phasmid), a genus of phasmids in the family Phasmatidae
 Greenia, a genus of arthropods in the family Laelapidae, synonym of Dinogamasus
 Greenia, a genus of nematodes in the family Rhabdolaimidae, synonym of Rogerus
 Greenia, a genus of plants in the family Poaceae, synonym of Limnodea